Small Town Dead is the third studio album by hard rock group Bleeker Ridge. It is their first to be released under a record label, and their only release with Roadrunner Records.

Track listing

2010 albums
Bleeker (band) albums
Roadrunner Records albums
Albums produced by Bob Marlette